Mir Ali Tabrizi was a distinguished Iranian calligrapher of the 14th century, to whom the invention of  Nas-Taliq calligraphy style is attributed.

Early life
He lived in the 14th century. Historians have not been able to unveil details of Mir Ali's life yet. It is known that he lived in Tabriz and was a poet as well as an adept calligrapher (see Dehkhoda dictionary).

Nas-Taliq calligraphy
He is known as father of Nas-Taliq, the most popular style of Persian calligraphy. He was thus titled "Qodwat al-Kottab" (literally 'the chief of the scribes'). He invented this beautiful calligraphy style by means of combining two older styles together (Naskh and Taliq).

Nas-Taliq is a light and elegant cursive script as other types of Islamic calligraphy. In contrast to other Islamic scripts, the Nas-Taliq has characters that appear to swing from the upper right to the lower left of each word as if suspended by an imaginary line. It featured elongated horizontal strokes and exaggerated rounded forms with no serifs. The diacritical marks were casually placed, and the lines were flowing rather than straight. There is a popular myth that Mir Ali Jafar Tabrizi, another well-known Persian calligrapher, was Mir Ali's pupil. Later, Jafar's students followed Mir Ali's style in Herat, where his scripts were frequently copied and highly praised.

References

References
 

14th-century calligraphers
14th-century Iranian people
Muslim artists
Calligraphers from Tabriz
Calligraphers of the medieval Islamic world